Hiromi Kobayashi may refer to:

 Hiromi Kobayashi (golfer) (born 1963), Japanese professional golfer
 Hiromi Kobayashi (synchronized swimmer) (born 1984), Japanese synchronized swimmer